The Buzz, stylized as The Buzz 15, and formerly known as Buzz Ng Bayan, was a Philippine weekly entertainment news and talk show. It premiered on June 13, 1999, replacing Showbiz Lingo, and was the second longest-running weekly entertainment news and talk show in Philippine television after GMA Network's Startalk. It featured local celebrity gossip and news. The show ended on April 5, 2015 to give way for the movie block Kapamilya Blockbusters since April 12, 2015.

History

The Buzz (1999–2013)

The Buzz premiered on June 13, 1999, as it replaced the popular Sunday afternoon Showbiz-oriented talk show (run for seven years) Showbiz Lingo, and was originally hosted solely by Boy Abunda with its first episode being taped at a restaurant in The Fort, Taguig. The show's original format was similar to ABS-CBN's The Correspondents were Abunda interacts with a group of showbiz field reporters dishing out the latest showbiz news. Showbiz columnist Ricky Lo and Walden Belen were the first co-hosts of the show, along with Tim Yap, Reena Cruz and Dolly Anne Carvajal as reporters.

The format was later on discarded when the network took in Kris Aquino during the show's second season on January 9, 2000. Aquino's inclusion in the show served as a reunion of sorts between her and Abunda, when they used to host Startalk on GMA Network. The show became an interesting gabfest with Aquino and Abunda dishing out the latest exclusives with the help of its reliable staff. Actress and model Angelica Jones and columnist Pat-P Daza-Planas were introduced as the new segment presenters after the departure of Yap and Carvajal from the show. Jones left the show a year later, and was replaced by reporter and blogger JV Villar in 2002, but later left after a few months. This was also the same year where Pat-P decided to leave due to commitments with her family and pursuing other ventures.

In 2003, the duo welcomed Cristy Fermin as an additional host, who used to headline the network's Saturday talk show S2: Showbiz Sabado and its predecessor Showbiz Lingo. Her opinions and commentaries made the show wider and more noticeable. This was also the same year where one of its original hosts, Lo, left to transfer to GMA Network.

Phoemela Barranda, who was then working at ABS-CBN's flagship newscast TV Patrol World as the anchor of Star Patrol, joined the show to headline the teasers before it actually starts in 2004. In 2005, one of its pioneer hosts, Lapus, left the show after his contract in ABS-CBN expired and was given a hosting stint to GMA's S-Files. The show welcomed actress Anne Curtis to host the new segment Wanna Buzz, but was later discarded a year later into Pinoy Big Brother Buzz (following the debut of the Philippine franchise of Big Brother), where she was joined by gossip reporter AJ Dee and comedians Chokoleit and Pokwang, but it did not do well, so the network decided to shelve the segment.

Jobert Sucaldito served as the replacement of Lapus in 2006. This year also presented Buzz Express, wherein other showbiz-related news were presented within a time span of 1–2 minutes. It was voice-overed by Roxy Liquigan and Eric John Salut, both staff of the show.

On March 11, 2007, Ruffa Gutierrez became the temporary replacement for Aquino who left the show to focus on her pregnancy and her family. Dawn Zulueta also served as a guest co-host when Ruffa Gutierrez went to the United States for a two-week vacation. When Gutierrez returned in June 2007, the network offered her a permanent co-hosting job in the show.

In October 15, 2008, Cristy Fermin was suspended by the network after she rattled off a series of accusations against former actress Nadia Montenegro in an episode aired on October 5, 2008. According to a statement released by the network, "It was deemed that Ms. Fermin did not conduct herself with due regard to social conventions and public morals. Her statements went beyond the bounds of decency as they involved innocent children who were not party to their personal dispute. Ms. Fermin's statements violated the highest standards of professionalism and journalistic integrity. The act committed by Ms. Fermin brought her and The Buzz to public disrepute, jeopardizing the name and goodwill of both the show and the network." On October 19, 2008, Ai-Ai de las Alas served as a substitute host for Cristy Fermin, who was suspended by the network for two months, until Aquino returned to the show on October 26, 2008.

In 2010, Ruffa Gutierrez left the show after signing an exclusive contract to TV5. KC Concepcion later replaced her on April 11.

In 2010, Aquino left the show after being an on-and-off host of the show for ten years. She decided to leave the show for the reason of that she wanted to spend time with her family and for her not to cause any trouble while her brother, Benigno S. Aquino III, is still in office as the President of the Philippines. Sucaldito, who has been on the show for 4 years, decided to left to concentrate on radio broadcasting (through his DZMM program Mismo! with Ahwel Paz) and his columnist job in Bulgar. After Aquino's departure, Charlene Gonzales and Toni Gonzaga replaced her as hosts In 2010. On January 8, 2012, KC Concepcion left the show for X Factor Philippines.

On October 13, 2013, Gonzaga and Gonzales bid farewell to the show. With the two hosts departure, Abunda hinted that the program will be undergoing changes. Abunda said, "Sa inyong walang patid na pagsubaybay, sa inyong walang sawang pagsuporta at sa patuloy naming pagbibigay serbisyo, kasama kayo sa isang panibagong simula. Kasali kayo sa pagbubukas ng isang bagong kabanata, mas malawak, mas malaki. Pakikinggan, paguusapan at pakikialaman. Ito ang pagbabagong kakapitan, pagbabagong tatatak sa puso at isipan. Ito ang inyong The Buzz."

Buzz ng Bayan (2013–2014)

On October 20, 2013, The Buzz format was discontinued and was reformatted into an interactive entertainment talk-show called Buzz ng Bayan (English: Buzz of the Nation). With the reformat, together with Boy Abunda, Carmina Villaroel and Janice de Belen were added as hosts. The show had three segments, namely: Top News Items, Opinions, and Panel Discussion. After the segment Top News Items, several personalities known as Bayan Buzzers (usually three), would give their own opinions regarding that certain issue. Aida Espiritu, aide of ABS-CBN president, CEO and COO Charo Santos-Concio and Onse Tolentino, a comedian and entertainment reporter/columnist, were the most notable and considered the resident Bayan Buzzers.
More than 6 months after the reformatted The Buzz came into airing, Villaroel confirmed that the show will again be reformatted and return to its old title as The Buzz. She also confirmed that she will not be part of the reformat, and stated that two former hosts in The Buzz will return to the show together with Boy Abunda.

The Buzz 15 (2014–2015)
On May 14, 2014, in ABS-CBN's official YouTube channel, the network hinted that the show will be revert to its original title, The Buzz 15. The said reformat will coincide the show's 15th anniversary. It premiered on May 18, 2014 featuring footage of the show's first episode and some of its most notable interviews and commentaries, then afterwards Abunda graced the show's re-opening. He later introduced the return of Toni Gonzaga and Kris Aquino as his co-hosts. This also marked the return of the segment P.O.V., wherein their first topic was about the concept of linked showbiz couples. After its pilot aired, most viewers applauded the show for its reformat and hoping for more episodes to come with this new and fresher look to show.

Cancellation
On April 5, 2015, The Buzz had their last show on an Easter Sunday. Boy Abunda delivered the final farewell on behalf of the co-hosts and staff, following the VTR that detailed the show's history and controversies that the hosts dealt with. Abunda cited changes through the years pertaining to how technology has changed the world, how it's changed the way we communicate, how it's changed the media, and how the news is delivered. But he assured three points in his farewell speech; "they will be back", "showbiz news is here to stay", and "the talk show genre is here to stay".

Hosts

Final main hosts
Boy Abunda (1999–2015)
Kris Aquino (2000–2010; 2014–2015)
Toni Gonzaga (2010–2015)

Former main hosts

Ricky Lo (1999–2003)
Cristy Fermin (2003–2008)
Ruffa Gutierrez (2007–2010)
KC Concepcion (2010–2012)
Charlene Gonzales (2010–2013)
Carmina Villaroel (2013–2014)
Janice de Belen (2013–2014)

Guest hosts

 Dawn Zulueta (2007, 2011; fill-in for Ruffa Gutierrez)
 Ai-Ai de las Alas (2008–2010; fill-in for Cristy Fermin and Kris Aquino)
 Gretchen Barretto (2013; fill-in for Charlene Gonzales)
 Vice Ganda (2012, 2014; fill-in for Boy Abunda and Kris Aquino)

Segment presenters

 Dolly Ann Carvajal (1999–2000)
 Walden Belen (1999-2000)
 Reena Cruz (1999-2000)
 Tim Yap (1999–2000)
 Angelica Jones (2000–2001)
 Pat-P Daza-Planas (2000–2002)
 JV Villar (2002)
 Phoemela Baranda (2004–2015; voice-over, 2010)
 Roxy Liquigan (voice-over; 2004–2014)
 Eric John Salut (voice-over; 2004–2014)
 Anne Curtis (for Wanna Buzz; 2005, Pinoy Big Brother Buzz; 2006)
 AJ Dee (for Pinoy Big Brother Buzz; 2006)
 Chokoleit (for Pinoy Big Brother Buzz; 2006)
 Pokwang (for Pinoy Big Brother Buzz; 2006)
 Jobert Sucaldito (2006–2010)
 Aida Espiritu (as a resident Bayan Buzzer; 2013–2014)
 Onse Tolentino (as a resident Bayan Buzzer; 2013–2014)

Awards
The following is an incomplete list of the awards and nominations received by The Buzz and its hosts:

See also
List of programs broadcast by ABS-CBN

References

External links
 Buzz ng Bayan website

ABS-CBN original programming
Entertainment news shows in the Philippines
1999 Philippine television series debuts
2015 Philippine television series endings
1990s Philippine television series
2000s Philippine television series
Philippine television talk shows
Filipino-language television shows